Twisted Croissant is a bakery with two locations in Portland, Oregon. Owner Kurt Goddard began selling pastries at farmers' markets in the Portland metropolitan area before opening the first brick and mortar bakery in northeast Portland's Irvington neighborhood in 2019. A second bakery opened in southeast Portland's Sellwood-Moreland neighborhood.

Description 

Twisted Croissant serves croissants with fillings such as ganache, mascarpone-lemon glaze, and seasonal fruit. The Loaded Corn Bread Croissant is made with corn flour and is filled with corn, green chiles, pancetta, green onion, and cheddar cheese. Willamette Week described the croissant as "basically patisserie as empanada". The Monte Carlo has ham, turkey, and Gruyère cheese, and is topped with crumbled bacon and maple syrup. The menu has also included  caramel apple cruff puffs, and "croissant-doughnut and croissant-muffin hybrids filled with fun flavors", according to Michael Russell of The Oregonian.

History 
Owner and head chef Kurt Goddard started selling pastries at farmers' markets in Beaverton, Hillsboro, and Portland (including the Hillsdale and Montavilla neighborhoods) in 2017. In 2018, he announced plans to open a brick and mortar bakery in northeast Portland's Irvington neighborhood. The 1,800-square-foot space, which opened on September 6, 2019, is used primarily for production and offers limited seating within the 600 square feet dedicated to retail operations.

During the COVID-19 pandemic, the business continued to operate via take-out and Uber Eats, except on Mondays. The business was burglarized in 2020. By 2022, a second location had opened in southeast Portland's Sellwood-Moreland neighborhood.

In 2023, the business offered a cha siu bao (barbecued pork) croissant for Lunar New Year.

Reception 
Michael Russell gave Twisted Croissant "honorable mention" in The Oregonian's 2019 list of the city's best croissants. Michelle Lopez included the business in Eater Portland's 2021 overview of "Where to Find Flaky, Crackly Croissants in Portland". Katherine Chew Hamilton ranked Twisted Croissant number three in Portland Monthly's 2021 list of "Our Top 6 Chocolate Croissants".

See also 

 List of bakeries

References

External links

 
 

2017 establishments in Oregon
Bakeries of Oregon
Irvington, Portland, Oregon
Restaurants established in 2017
Restaurants in Portland, Oregon
Sellwood-Moreland, Portland, Oregon